The Mosquito River is a river of Minas Gerais state in southeastern Brazil. It is a tributary of the Gorutuba River.

The river rises in the Serra do Talhado, in the  Serra Nova State Park.
It flows west to join the Gorutuba.

See also
 List of rivers of Minas Gerais

References

Rivers of Minas Gerais